Khlevny (masculine), Khlevnaya (feminine), or Khlevnoye (neuter) is the name of several rural localities in Russia:
Khlevnoye, Lipetsk Oblast, a selo in Khlevensky Selsoviet of Khlevensky District of Lipetsk Oblast
Khlevnoye, Ryazan Oblast, a village in Alyashevsky Rural Okrug of Zakharovsky District of Ryazan Oblast